Wesley de Jesus Correia (born February 9, 1990 in Diadema), known as Lelê, is a Brazilian footballer who plays for Água Santa as forward.

Career statistics

References

External links

Lelê at Footballdatabase

1990 births
Living people
Brazilian footballers
Brazilian expatriate footballers
Association football forwards
Campeonato Brasileiro Série A players
Campeonato Brasileiro Série B players
Campeonato Brasileiro Série C players
Bahraini Premier League players
Coritiba Foot Ball Club players
Fortaleza Esporte Clube players
Rio Branco Sport Club players
Oeste Futebol Clube players
Santa Cruz Futebol Clube players
Ceará Sporting Club players
Botafogo Futebol Clube (SP) players
Clube Náutico Capibaribe players
Mirassol Futebol Clube players
Al-Muharraq SC players
América Futebol Clube (RN) players
ABC Futebol Clube players
Esporte Clube Água Santa players
Brazilian expatriate sportspeople in Bahrain
Expatriate footballers in Bahrain
Footballers from São Paulo (state)
People from Diadema